The boxing events of the 1971 Mediterranean Games were held in İzmir, Turkey.

Medalists

Medal table

References
1971 Mediterranean Games report at the International Committee of Mediterranean Games (CIJM) website
1971 Mediterranean Games boxing tournament at Amateur Boxing Results

Medi
Sports at the 1971 Mediterranean Games
1971